UCCI may refer to:

 Union of Ibero-American Capital Cities, a non-governmental organization of 29 cities
 United Concordia Companies, Inc., a U.S. dental insurance company
 Universidad Continental de Ciencias e Ingeniería, a Peruvian university in Huancayo, Junín Region
 University College of the Cayman Islands, a tertiary educational institution
 Upstream capital costs index, a proprietary index of the rate of inflation in oil and gas projects
 Toni Ucci (1922–2014), Italian actor and comedian